Chaetosphaeridium globosum is a one-celled alga which is thought to represent an ancient lineage of the green plants. This organism exists in a filamentous form with one flagella per cell. It is a freshwater species. The flagellum is covered in scales in a 3-prong irregular shape called ‘maple leafs’. The cells are usually  in diameter and with one pyrenoid. Each cell bears long bristle.

Researchers have found that the mitochondrial DNA of Chaetosphaeridium is markedly different from that of land plants, suggesting that the mitochondria of land plants evolved significantly after the common ancestor between them and living green algae. A very slight similarity exists between liverwort mtDNA and Chaetosphaeridium. The chloroplast DNA is markedly similar, however, indicating that a close relationship had existed between the Viridiplantae and the clade that includes Chaetosphaeridium. This seems to argue that chloroplasts in green plants originated in prehistoric green algae; the family which includes Chaetosphaeridium globosum.

Chloroplasts are known to be captured (symbiotic) cyanobacteria with their own genome. Part of this genome has been transferred to the nucleus and part has been retained in the chloroplast for the continuation of metabolic processes. This symbiosis, now proven by modern genomics, has shown us how Chaetosphaeridium globosum links ancient cyanobacteria with modern green plants.

References

Hausmann, Klaus. Hülsmann, Norbert. Radek, Renate. Protistology. E.Schweizerbart’sche Verlagsbuchhandlung. Third edition. 2003
Turmel, M. Otis, C. Lemieux, C. The Complete Chloroplast DNA Sequences of the Charophycean Green Algae Staurastrum and Zygnema Reveal that the Chloroplast Genome Underwent Extensive Changes During the Evolution of the Zygnemateles. BMC Biol 2005 Oct 20; 3:22. 
Raven, John. Allen, John. Genomics and Chloroplast Evolution: What did Cyanobacteria Do For Plants? Genome Biol. 2003; 4(3): 209

Charophyta
Plants described in 1893